Gelsinger may refer to:

 Jesse Gelsinger (1981–1999), American, the first person publicly identified as having died in a clinical trial for gene therapy
 Pat Gelsinger, author, CEO of Intel